Mijnatun is a village in the Alagyaz Municipality of the Aragatsotn Province of Armenia. It is mostly populated by Yazidis.

References

Populated places in Aragatsotn Province
Yazidi populated places in Armenia